is a Japanese band consisting of Yosuke Sakanoue and Kosuke Yonehara.

Discography

Studio albums

Singles

References 

Japanese musical duos
Japanese pop music groups
Musical groups established in 2015
2015 establishments in Japan